This is the discography of Japanese pop singer, Hitomi Shimatani.

Discography

Studio albums

Compilation & cover albums

Singles

DVDs
8colors Clips+Live, October 23, 2002
Vibration!: Live & Clips, March 17, 2004
Concert Tour 2004, December 22, 2004
Special Live: Crossover, June 15, 2005
Visual Works 2004–2006, March 15, 2006
Premium Live 2005: Heart & Symphony & More, March 15, 2006
Special Live: Crossover II, December 13, 2006
Live 2007 – Prima Rosa, September 12, 2007
Cross Over III: Premium Meets Premium, November 8, 2008

Discographies of Japanese artists
Pop music discographies